The Palazzo Giustinian Persico is an early-Renaissance-style palace located at the corner with the Rio di San Tomà, near Palazzo Tiepolo and across the canal from Palazzi Mocenigo on the Grand Canal, in the Sestiere of San Polo, Venice, Italy.

History
The palace was commissioned in the 13th century by the aristocratic Giustinian family, but later transferred to the Persico family. The facade, built in the 16th century, resembles that of buildings by Mauro Codussi.

Bibliography

References

Giustinian Persico
Giustinian Persico
Renaissance architecture in Venice